Osbaldeston is a village and civil parish in Lancashire, England about  north-west of Blackburn and  east of Preston. The population of the civil parish as taken at the 2011 census was 185.

Osbaldeston is on the A59 road and lies on the south bank of the River Ribble opposite Ribchester. The hamlet of Osbaldeston Green lies due north of the village. There is record of a Roman Road in the area.

Osbaldeston Hall, which lies beside the Ribble, is a Grade II* listed building dating from about 1600, constructed with crucks. It is associated with the Catholic martyr Edward Osbaldeston. Oxendale Hall is a building of 1656, with a gabled façade. The hall has two stories, and most of the house has a Snecked masonry façade from a 1946 restoration. This was performed after a long period of time when many parts of the hall, which was used as a farmhouse, fell into dilapidation. Much of the inside of the house, including the 'banqueting hall', has visible timber framing.

See also

Listed buildings in Osbaldeston

References

External links

 Osbaldeston page at GenUKI
 
 
  
 

Villages in Lancashire
Civil parishes in Lancashire
Geography of Ribble Valley